Euryplocia striatipennis is a genus of beetles in the family Cerambycidae.

References

Apomecynini
Beetles described in 1939